Hyllisia koui is a species of beetle in the family Cerambycidae. It was described by Breuning in 1962.

References

koui
Beetles described in 1962
Taxa named by Stephan von Breuning (entomologist)